Elachista fasciocaliginosa is a moth in the family Elachistidae. It was described by Sugisima in 2005. It is found in Japan(Honshu).

The length of the forewings is about 2.8 mm for males and 2.9-3.1 mm for females. The forewings are black-brownish with two white-
silvery fascia. There are probably multiple generations per year.

The larvae feed on Miscanthus sinensis. They mine the leaves of their host plant. The mine starts as a purplish linear gallery and later becomes greenish and elongate blotch-like. Pupation takes place outside of the mine.

References

Moths described in 2005
fasciocaliginosa
Moths of Japan